Petita Ayarza Pérez (born January 10, 1965) is a Panamanian indigenous political leader and businesswoman. In the 2019 general election, she became the first Guna woman to run for a seat as deputy and be elected to the National Assembly of Panama.

Biography
Petita Ayarza was born in Rio Sidra in 1965. She was named after former first lady Petita Saa de Robles, the wife of President Marco Aurelio Robles.

She holds a licentiate in human resources and an ecological tourism technician degree, the latter from the University of Panama. She has worked as a businesswoman in the tourism sector in the Guna Yala region, and is the leader of a tourism association for 28 islands.

Political career
Ayarza has been a member of the Democratic Revolutionary Party (PRD) for more than 20 years, during which she assumed leadership positions as party delegate, president of the organization area via election, and president of the party's regional collective. She was the first woman to hold these positions within her party in the Guna Yala region.

In her political speech she advocates for the rights of indigenous peoples, and especially for the empowerment of women of the Guna ethnic group.

2019 Panamanian general election
Petita Ayarza was the first Guna woman to be presented by the PRD as a candidate for a legislative position for Circuit 10-1, which includes the districts of Ailigandí, Madugandí, and Narganá. She won a seat in the 2019 general election, receiving 38.77% of the votes, according to Electoral Court data.

References

External links
 Petita Ayarza Pérez at the National Assembly of Panama

1965 births
Democratic Revolutionary Party politicians
Living people
Members of the National Assembly (Panama)
Panamanian businesspeople
Panamanian people of Kuna descent
21st-century Panamanian women politicians
21st-century Panamanian politicians
University of Panama alumni